RFA Eddyrock (A198) was an Eddy-class coastal tanker of the Royal Fleet Auxiliary.

References
 Eddy-Class Coastal Tankers
 Historical RFA

 

Eddy-class coastal tankers
1952 ships
Ships built on the River Blyth